Andrea Brown may refer to:
 Andrea Brown (R&B singer)
 Andrea Brown (soprano)